Viktoria Mikhailovna Belinsky (née Milvidskaia, 20 April 1967) is a former professional tennis player from Russia. Her highest WTA rankings were 168 in singles and 145 in doubles.

Early life
Belinsky began playing tennis at the age of seven in Moscow. She played for the famous Spartak tennis club, and her coaches were Alexandra Granaturova and Larisa Preobrazhenskaya.

In 1983, she won the First International Tournament in Moscow which earned her the honour of Master of Sports of the USSR, International Class (equates to international champion).

Professional career
She was a member of the USSR national tennis team (1983–1989) and represented the USSR in many different tournaments around the world. In 1984, she became the youngest USSR national champion.

Belinsky played in all Grand Slam tournaments. She had career wins over Manon Bollegraf, Tami Whitlinger, Sandra Wasserman, Nicole Arendt, Inés Gorrochategui, Lubomira Bacheva, Regina Maršíková, Andrea Strnadová, Sabine Hack, and Radka Bobková, and stopped playing in 1993 due to a knee injury. The same year, she moved to the United States.

Belinsky has an M.A. in physical education from the State Institute of Physical Culture and Sports in Moscow. She received this degree in May 1989.

From 2005 to 2008, Belinsky worked at the Russian NTV PLUS Tennis Channel. Her program was titled Tennis coach – is it nature or nurtured?. She interviewed many famous tennis coaches including: Wayne Bryan, Nick Bollettieri, Bud Collins, Robert Lansdorp, Carlos Rodriguez, Richard Williams. In addition, she has interviewed players such as Serena Williams, Andy Roddick, Anna Kournikova, Marat Safin and Janko Tipsarević. She worked as a sports broadcaster at the Olympic Games in Beijing (2008), and as a tennis analyst at Wimbledon, the US Open, the Davis Cup, and the Federation Cup.

In 2014, Belinsky worked as a coach for the USTA Player Development program in New York City.

In 2015, she moved to Florida and began working as a private coach.

Junior Grand Slam finals

Girls' doubles: 1 (runner-up)

ITF finals

Singles (1–4)

Doubles (14–2)

Other finals

Singles

Doubles

References

External links
 
 
Tennis Abstract: Viktoria Milvidskaia WTA Match Results.
 Australian Open – Results Archive – Viktoria Milvidskaia].
Tennis Stats – H2H Stats – MatchStat Viktoria Milvidskaia.
WAVE OF FUTURE HERE FROM SOVIET The New York Times.
NTV Interview: "So far and so close". Interview with Anna Kurnikova by Viktoria Milvidskaia.

1967 births
Living people
American female tennis players
American tennis coaches
Sports coaches from Miami
Tennis players from Miami
Tennis people from New York (state)
Tennis people from California
Tennis players from Moscow
Soviet female tennis players
Russian expatriates in the United States
Universiade medalists in tennis
Universiade gold medalists for the Soviet Union
Medalists at the 1987 Summer Universiade
21st-century American women
Friendship Games medalists in tennis